
Glastronome is a defunct restaurant in Limmen, in the Netherlands. It was a fine dining restaurant that was awarded one Michelin star in 1980 and retained that rating until 1985.

Head chef in the time of the Michelin star was Jaap Istha.

Restaurant Glastronome closed down in 1987.

See also
List of Michelin starred restaurants in the Netherlands

References 

Michelin Guide starred restaurants in the Netherlands
Defunct restaurants in the Netherlands
Restaurants in the Netherlands